Khamis al-Qayfi is a sub-district located in Kharif District, 'Amran Governorate, Yemen. Khamis al-Qayfi had a population of 3127 according to the 2004 census.

References 

Sub-districts in Kharif District